Arfa Deh (also Romanized as Arfa‘ Deh; also known as Afarūdbār, Arfa‘ Rūdbār, Arfeh Deh, and Arfeh Kūh) is a village in Rastupey Rural District, in the Central District of Savadkuh County, Mazandaran Province, Iran. At the 2006 census, its population was 379, in 99 families.

References 

Populated places in Savadkuh County